Artesia Township is one of twenty-six townships in Iroquois County, Illinois, USA.  As of the 2010 census, its population was 945 and it contained 428 housing units.  Artesia Township formed from portions of Ash Grove and Loda townships sometime prior to 1921.

Geography

Cities, towns, villages
 Buckley

Cemeteries
The township contains these two cemeteries: Lisk and Saint John's Lutheran.

Major highways
  Interstate 57
  U.S. Route 45

Demographics

School districts
 Cissna Park Community Unit School District 6
 Iroquois West Community Unit School District 10
 Paxton-Buckley-Loda Community Unit School District 10

Political districts
 Illinois' 15th congressional district
 State House District 105
 State Senate District 53

References
 
 United States Census Bureau 2007 TIGER/Line Shapefiles
 United States National Atlas

External links
 City-Data.com
 Illinois State Archives

Townships in Iroquois County, Illinois
Townships in Illinois